The crocodile snake eel (Brachysomophis crocodilinus) is an eel in the family Ophichthidae (worm/snake eels). It was described by Edward Turner Bennett in 1833. It is a tropical, marine eel which is known from the Indo-Pacific, including East Africa, the Society Islands, Japan, and Australia. Males can reach a maximum total length of 120 centimetres. It dwells at a depth range of 0–30 metres (most often at around 0–2 m), and inhabits coral reefs. It forms burrows in sand and lies in wait to ambush prey, leaving only its eyes exposed. Its diet consists of octopuses, species of Calcarina, and finfish.

The species epithet "crocodilinus", as well as the common name, refer to the species' crocodilian appearance. The crocodile snake eel is used in Chinese medicine.

References

External links
 

Ophichthidae
Fish described in 1833
Taxa named by Edward Turner Bennett